Pir Fazlur Rahman is a Bangladeshi politician and the incumbent Member of Parliament from Sunamganj-4.

Early life
Rahman was born on 9 January 1969. He completed his undergraduate and graduate degrees in law.

Career
Rahman was elected to Parliament from Sunamganj-4 as a Jatiya Party candidate in 2014 and re-elected on 30 December 2018.

References

Living people
9th Jatiya Sangsad members
10th Jatiya Sangsad members
1969 births
Jatiya Party politicians
People from Sunamganj District